Israel will compete at the 2024 Summer Paralympics in Paris from 28 August to 8 September 2024.

Disability classifications

Every participant at the Paralympics has their disability grouped into one of five disability categories; amputation, the condition may be congenital or sustained through injury or illness; cerebral palsy; wheelchair athletes, there is often overlap between this and other categories; visual impairment, including blindness; Les autres, any physical disability that does not fall strictly under one of the other categories, for example dwarfism or multiple sclerosis. Each Paralympic sport then has its own classifications, dependent upon the specific physical demands of competition. Events are given a code, made of numbers and letters, describing the type of event and classification of the athletes competing. Some sports, such as athletics, divide athletes by both the category and severity of their disabilities, other sports, for example swimming, group competitors from different categories together, the only separation being based on the severity of the disability.

Competitors
The Israeli delegation will includes 1 athlete, competing in 1 sport.

Shooting 

Israel paralympic shooter, Yuliya Chernoy earned a quate for Israel after she won a gold medal in the R3 - Mixed 10m Air Rifle Prone SH1 event at the 2022  World Shooting Para Sport World Cup.

Mixed

See also
Israel at the Paralympics

References

Nations at the 2024 Summer Paralympics
2024
2024 in Israeli sport